The Post Office Act 1908 (c.48) is an act of the Parliament of the United Kingdom

This was an extensive act covering many aspect of the mail system and some of the main provisions were: reaffirmation of the General Post Office monopoly for the carrying of mail and it gave the power to fix the postage rates to The Treasury with a minimum rate of at least one penny for an inland letter, a half-penny for a postcard, a book packet should not cost more than one halfpenny for every two ounces in weight in addition to other rates. Special rate were to be implemented for postal packets of books and papers impressed for blind people. Unpaid of deficient postage was to be charged at double the deficiency by the addressee and when rejected by the addressee, was to be returned to the sender who should pay the deficiency.

The Treasury was allowed to make regulation concerning mail with foreign countries.

Petitions and addresses to His Majesty or to Parliament, and on votes and parliamentary proceedings were allowed to be sent free though members of parliament could not receive items weighing more than thirty-two ounces postage free.

Postal censorship was permitted under provisions of the act when warrants are issued by a secretary of state in both Great Britain and in the Channel Islands.

Some of the lesser provisions were:
To provide postal services (including cash on delivery services) and telecommunication services
To provide a banking service of the kind commonly known as a giro system and such other services by means of which money may be remitted (whether by means of money orders, postal orders or otherwise) as it thinks fit
To provide data processing services
To perform services for Her Majesty's Government in the United Kingdom, Her Majesty's Government in Northern Ireland or the government of a country or territory outside the United Kingdom or for local or national health service authorities in the United Kingdom.

Ireland
The act remained as the main legislation governing the postal services under the Minister for Posts and Telegraphs in Ireland after the establishment of the independent state in 1922. The Post Office (Amendment) Bill, 1951 repealed and amended several sections of the original act and was presented by the Minister for Posts and Telegraphs, Erskine Childers in Dáil Éireann.

Repealed acts
The following acts were repealed mostly in whole and some in part:
 Post Office (Revenues) Act 1710
 The Post Office (Repeal of Laws) Act, 1837
The Post Office Management Act, 1837
The Post Office (Offences) Act, 1837
The Post Office (Duties) Act, 1840
The Post Office (Duties) Act, 1844
The Post Office (Duties) Act, 184
The Post Office (Money Orders) Act, 1848
The Colonial Inland Post Office Act, 1849
The Public Revenue and Consolidated Fund Charges Act, 1854
The Inland Revenue Act, 1855
The Post Office (Duties) Act, 1860
The Post Office Lands Act, 1863
The Telegraph Act, 1869
The Post Office Act, 1870
The Post Office Act, 1875
The Summary Jurisdiction Act, 1879
The Post Office (Money Orders) Act, 1880
The Post Office (Newspaper) Act, 1881
The Post Office (Land) Act, 1881
The Post Office (Reply Post Cards) Act, 1882
The Post Office (Money Orders) Act, 1883
The Post Office (Protection) Act, 1884
The Telegraph (Isle of ' Man) Act, 1889
The Post Office Act, 1891
The Post Office Act, 1892
The Post Office Amendment Act, 1895
The Post Office and Telegraph Act, 1897
The Post Office (Guarantee) Act, 1898
The Local Government (Ireland) Act, 1898
The Post Office Guarantee (No. 2) Act, 1898
The Post Office (Money Orders) Act, 1903
The Post Office Act, 1904
The Post Office (Money Orders) Act, 1906
The Post Office (Literature for the Blind) Act, 1906

References

United Kingdom Acts of Parliament 1908
General Post Office